Victoria Pelova (born 3 June 1999) is a Dutch professional footballer who plays as a midfielder for Women's Super League club Arsenal and the Netherlands national team.

Career
Pelova represented Netherlands at the 2018 FIFA U-20 Women's World Cup. She was selected for the 2019 FIFA Women's World Cup, as well as the 2020 Tokyo Olympics. At the Olympics she scored her first international goal in the Netherlands opening match against Zambia. Pelova was named to the squad for UEFA Women's Euro 2022.

Personal life
  
Pelova pursues Applied Mathematics at Delft University of Technology. During her childhood, she excelled in several different sports including chess, snowboarding, and tennis.

Career statistics

International

Scores and results list Netherlands' goal tally first, score column indicates score after each Pelova goal.

Honours 
Ajax

 KNVB Women's Cup: 2021–22
 Eredivisie Cup: 2020–21
Arsenal 

 FA Women's League Cup: 2022–23

References

External links
Senior national team profile at Onsoranje.nl (in Dutch)
Under-20 national team profile at Onsoranje.nl (in Dutch)
Under-19 national team profile at Onsoranje.nl (in Dutch)

1999 births
Living people
Footballers from Delft
Dutch women's footballers
Dutch people of Bulgarian descent
ADO Den Haag (women) players
Eredivisie (women) players
Netherlands women's international footballers
2019 FIFA Women's World Cup players
Women's association football midfielders
Footballers at the 2020 Summer Olympics
Olympic footballers of the Netherlands
AFC Ajax (women) players
UEFA Women's Euro 2022 players
Arsenal W.F.C. players
Women's Super League players
Dutch expatriate sportspeople in England
Expatriate women's footballers in England
Dutch expatriate women's footballers